Verbal memory is a term used in cognitive psychology which refers to memory of words and other abstractions involving language.

Verbal encoding
Verbal encoding refers to the interpretation of verbal stimuli. Verbal encoding appears to be strongly left-lateralized in the medial temporal lobe of the human brain; however, its functional neuroanatomy can vary between individuals.

Verbal recall
Verbal recall refers to the recollection of verbal information. Although left-lateralization is typically associated with language, studies suggest that symmetrical bi-lateralization of language in the brain is advantageous to verbal recall.

See also
Semantic memory
Declarative memory
Sensory memory
Visual memory
Spatial memory

References

Memory